"Love Yourself" is a 2019 song by Billy Porter, written and produced by D. Smith. It reached number one on the Dance Club Songs in the issue dated September 7, 2019.

Charts

Weekly charts

Year-end charts

References

2019 songs
LGBT-related songs